Events in the year 2022 in the Czech Republic.

Incumbents 

 President – Miloš Zeman
 Prime Minister – Petr Fiala

Events 
Ongoing — COVID-19 pandemic in the Czech Republic

 20 January – The government suspends plans to make COVID-19 vaccination mandatory for key workers and people over the age of 60, which was expected to come into effect in March.

 3 September – An estimated 70,000 people, mostly from parties such as Freedom and Direct Democracy and the Communist Party, march in Prague, Czech Republic, demanding the government do more to control soaring energy prices in the country. Organizers of the march criticized rising energy costs, immigration to the country, mask mandates, and the country's involvement in the Russo-Ukrainian War.

Deaths 

 3 January – Jiří Patera, 85, Czech-born Canadian mathematician.
 8 January – Stanislav Rudolf, 89, Czech writer, screenwriter and dramaturge.
 9 January – Dušan Klein, 82, Czech film director and screenwriter (How the World Is Losing Poets, How Poets Are Losing Their Illusions, How Poets Are Enjoying Their Lives).
 31 January –
 Jiří Kyncl, 59, Czech Olympic speed skater (1988, 1992).
 Radko Pytlík, 93, Czech literary historian and writer.
 2 February – Jan Netopilík, 85, Czech Olympic long jumper (1960).

References 

 
2020s in the Czech Republic
Years of the 21st century in the Czech Republic
Czech Republic
Czech Republic